Syrnola vanhyningi is a species of sea snail, a marine gastropod mollusk in the family Pyramidellidae, the pyrams and their allies.

Description
The length of the shell measures  2.3 mm.

Distribution
This species occurs in the following locations:
 Gulf of Mexico off West Florida.

References

External links
 To Encyclopedia of Life
 To World Register of Marine Species

Pyramidellidae
Gastropods described in 1944